The 2004 Pennsylvania 500 was the 20th stock car race of the 2004 NASCAR Nextel Cup Series season and the 32nd iteration of the event. The race was held on Sunday, August 1, 2004, before a crowd of 90,000 in Long Pond, Pennsylvania, at Pocono Raceway, a 2.5 miles (4.0 km) triangular permanent course. The race took the scheduled 200 laps to complete. At race's end, Jimmie Johnson of Hendrick Motorsports would hold off the field on the final restart with five to go to win his 10th career NASCAR Nextel Cup Series win and his fourth win of the season, sweeping both Pocono races in 2004. To fill out the podium, Mark Martin of Roush Racing and Kasey Kahne of Evernham Motorsports would finish second and third, respectively.

Background 

The race was held at Pocono Raceway, which is a three-turn superspeedway located in Long Pond, Pennsylvania. The track hosts two annual NASCAR Sprint Cup Series races, as well as one Xfinity Series and Camping World Truck Series event. Until 2019, the track also hosted an IndyCar Series race.

Pocono Raceway is one of a very few NASCAR tracks not owned by either Speedway Motorsports, Inc. or International Speedway Corporation. It is operated by the Igdalsky siblings Brandon, Nicholas, and sister Ashley, and cousins Joseph IV and Chase Mattioli, all of whom are third-generation members of the family-owned Mattco Inc, started by Joseph II and Rose Mattioli.

Outside of the NASCAR races, the track is used throughout the year by Sports Car Club of America (SCCA) and motorcycle clubs as well as racing schools and an IndyCar race. The triangular oval also has three separate infield sections of racetrack – North Course, East Course and South Course. Each of these infield sections use a separate portion of the tri-oval to complete the track. During regular non-race weekends, multiple clubs can use the track by running on different infield sections. Also some of the infield sections can be run in either direction, or multiple infield sections can be put together – such as running the North Course and the South Course and using the tri-oval to connect the two.

Entry list 

*While Earnhardt Jr. had originally intended to run all of the race, he would eventually exit the car, being replaced by John Andretti on lap 52 due to injuries sustained at a sports car race. Earnhardt Jr. would go onto say that he also did not want to run the race due to problems with the car all weekend. However, as Earnhardt Jr. did start the race, he was credited with the finish.

Practice 
Initially, three practices were originally going to be held- one on Friday, and two on Saturday. However, rain on Saturday would cancel the two Saturday practices, only leaving the Friday session to be run.

First and final practice 
The only 2-hour practice session was held on Friday, July 30, at 11:20 AM EST.

Qualifying 
Qualifying was held on Friday, July 30, at 3:10 PM EST. Each driver would have two laps to set a fastest time; the fastest of the two would count as their official qualifying lap. Positions 1-38 would be decided on time, while positions 39-43 would be based on provisionals. Four spots are awarded by the use of provisionals based on owner's points. The fifth is awarded to a past champion who has not otherwise qualified for the race. If no past champ needs the provisional, the next team in the owner points will be awarded a provisional.

Three drivers would fail to qualify: Kevin Lepage, Andy Hillenburg, and A. J. Henriksen.

Full qualifying results

Race results

References 

2004 NASCAR Nextel Cup Series
NASCAR races at Pocono Raceway
August 2004 sports events in the United States
2004 in sports in Pennsylvania